Đorđe Milosavljević may refer to:

 Đorđe Milosavljević (basketball) (born 1994), Serbian basketball player
 Đorđe Milosavljević (writer) (born 1969), Serbian screenwriter and film director